M is a book by Australian author Peter Robb about the Italian painter Michelangelo Merisi da Caravaggio. First published in 1998 in Australia by Duffy & Snellgrove, the book provoked controversy when it was published in Britain in 2000. It was published in the United States as M: The Man Who Became Caravaggio (New York: Henry Holt, 2000).

M won the (Australian) National Biography Award and the Victorian Premier's Award.

References

External links 
Description of M by publisher
Interview with Peter Robb on M
 

Caravaggio
1998 non-fiction books
Duffy & Snellgrove books
Australian non-fiction books
Italian biographies